This Is Hyony is Kpop singer Lee Jung Hyun's first Japanese album. Contains some of her most popular songs, translated into Japanese, with some of her previous singles in the original Korean. Some of the songs sung in Japanese have new musical arrangements.

Track listing
 ワ-come on- (Wa)
 Heaven
 Peace
 ミチョ (Micho / Mich'yo)
 タラダラ (Taradara / Dala Dala)
 アリアリ (Ariari / Ari Ari)
 DaTo ~パックォ~ (Ba Kkwo / Change)
 GX 339-4
 夢 (Yume / Dream)
 Passion ~情熱~ (Passion ~Jounetsu~)
 Heavy world
 Passion ~情熱~ (New York Remix) (Bonus Track)

2006 debut albums
Lee Jung-hyun albums